The Gymnastics competition in the 2005 Summer Universiade were held in İzmir, Turkey.

Medal overview

Artistic gymnastics

Men's events

Women's events

Rhythmic gymnastics

Medal table

References
 Universiade gymnastics medalists on HickokSports
 Universiade rhythmic gymnastics medalists on HickokSports

Universiade
2005 Summer Universiade
2005